Abramo dall'Arpa (died 1566) was an Italian harpist and the likely grandfather of Abramino dall'Arpa. In 1542, he played the part of Pan in a dramatic production at the court of Mantua. He continued to serve the court under Guglielmo I Gonzaga in the 1550s and 1560s. Around 1560, Ferdinand I asked him to come to Vienna, where he instructed the Emperor's children in music.

References
Hárran, Don. "Abramo dall’Arpa". Grove Music Online (subscription required). ed. L. Macy. Retrieved on March 5, 2007.

1566 deaths
16th-century Italian Jews
Jewish classical musicians
Italian classical harpists
Year of birth unknown
Musicians from Mantua